Thomas Richards (8 January 1899 – 4 January 1946) was an American film editor.

His credits include The Maltese Falcon (1941), Each Dawn I Die (1939), Dangerous (1935) and The Seventh Cross (1944).

He was married to Glenda Farrell from 1921 to 1929, and the father of Tommy Farrell. He died in Los Angeles, California.

Selected filmography
 Jimmy the Gent (1934)
 Dangerous (1935)
 Stage Struck (1936)
 Each Dawn I Die (1939)
 The Maltese Falcon (1941)
 Thumbs Up (1943)
 The Seventh Cross (1944)

External links 

1899 births
1946 deaths
American film editors